Gilbertolus is a genus of dogtooth characins from northwestern South America, restricted to the Atrato, Magdalena and  Maracaibo basins.

Species
There are currently three described species in this genus.
 Gilbertolus alatus (Steindachner, 1878)
 Gilbertolus atratoensis L. P. Schultz, 1943
 Gilbertolus maracaiboensis L. P. Schultz, 1943

References

Cynodontidae
Freshwater fish of Colombia
Magdalena River
Fish of Venezuela
Taxa named by Carl H. Eigenmann
Fish described in 1907